Donald Edward Cheeks (born May 1, 1931) is an American politician. He is a member of the Georgia State Senate from the 23rd district from 1992 to 2004. He is a member of the Republican party. Cheeks also served in the Georgia House of Representatives from 1967 to 1968 (District 104), 1971 to 1972 (District 78), and 1979 to 1992 (District 89).

References

Living people
Republican Party Georgia (U.S. state) state senators
1931 births
People from Richmond County, Georgia
21st-century American politicians